Eggleton (or Egleton) is a small civil parish in Herefordshire, England. Its main centres of population are Lower Eggleton and Upper Eggleton.

The parish is centred on the A4103 road between the cities of Hereford  to the south-west and Worcester  to the north-east. The parish shares Stretton Grandison Group Parish Council with the nearby parishes of Stretton Grandison, Castle Frome and Canon Frome.

References

External links

Civil parishes in Herefordshire